Zdeněk Bobrovský (1 December 1933 – 21 November 2014) was a Czech basketball player. He was voted to the Czechoslovakian 20th Century Team.

National team career
With the senior Czechoslovakian national team, Bobrovský competed in the men's tournament at the 1952 Summer Olympics and the 1960 Summer Olympics. With Czechoslovakia, he also won silver medals at the 1951 EuroBasket and the 1955 EuroBasket, and the bronze medal at the 1957 EuroBasket.

References

External links
 

1933 births
2014 deaths
People from Rosice
Czech men's basketball players
Olympic basketball players of Czechoslovakia
Basketball players at the 1952 Summer Olympics
Basketball players at the 1960 Summer Olympics
Sportspeople from the South Moravian Region